The 1927–28 SK Rapid Wien season was the 30th season in club history.

Squad

Squad and statistics

Squad statistics

Fixtures and results

League

Cup

Mitropa Cup

References

1927-28 Rapid Wien Season
Rapid